Dallon James Weekes (born May 4, 1981) is an American singer, songwriter, musician, and record producer. He is best known as a member of Panic! at the Disco from 2009 to 2017, performing in the band as a bassist, keyboardist, backing vocalist, and songwriter. He was also the frontman of the power pop band and later solo musical project The Brobecks. Weekes currently performs as the frontman for the rock duo I Dont Know How But They Found Me.

Early life
Weekes was born in the small town of Verona, Missouri, near a large Amish community. He is the second of four children and was raised in a Mormon family in Clearfield, Utah, where his parents moved shortly after he was born. Weekes attended Clearfield High School, where he met most of his former Brobecks bandmates. After graduating with honors in 1999, Weekes served as a full-time Mormon Missionary in Oklahoma for two years. After returning home he shortly attended Weber State University before dropping out to pursue music full-time.

Music career

The Brobecks (2002–2013)
The band began as a weekend hobby for Weekes shortly after he returned to Utah after living in Oklahoma for two years. The group's name was inspired by a person from Dallon's school days. The original line-up consisted of Weekes, photographer/producer Matt Glass and another friend from high school.  After a few years of recording basement demos, touring and line-up changes, the band was offered a contract from an imprint of Drive-Thru Records, and Weekes was offered solo record contracts by Sony BMG, Interscope Records, and a smaller indie label if he would drop his bandmates. Weekes declined.

The Brobecks opened for bands such as Fall Out Boy, Phantom Planet, Ben Kweller, and The Bravery.  Despite all the label interest and album success for an indie band, the band remained independent and unsigned.

In late 2012, Weekes released the Quiet Title EP for download on his Bandcamp page for The Brobecks, as well as an option to purchase a physical copy of the Violent Things Reissue CD. The Quiet Title EP consists of two songs, "Anyone I Know" and "Cluster Hug", featuring Ian Crawford on guitar and recorded/edited with help from former Brobecks drummer, Matt Glass. In November 2012, Weekes stated in an interview with Salt Lake City's X96 radio station that these songs were written during the songwriting and recording process for Panic's fourth studio album, but did not fit with their collective vision for the new record.

Panic! at the Disco (2009–2017)

After the departure of Ryan Ross and Jon Walker in 2009, Weekes and Ian Crawford were hired to replace Ross and Walker for Panic! at the Disco on a temporary, touring basis for their second studio album Pretty. Odd. (2008). Weekes' 'touring only' status changed in mid-2010, while on tour with the band in China. It was then that he was asked by Brendon Urie and Spencer Smith to join them indefinitely. However, his permanent status within the band remained publicly unknown until Weekes confirmed in mid-2012 via Twitter his involvement with the band as a full-time member.

During his tenure as an official member of Panic! at the Disco, Weekes was responsible for the conceptualization of the cover art for the band's third studio album, Vices & Virtues (2011), and was also featured on the album cover, masked and standing in the background behind Smith and Urie. He was credited with writing all but two songs on the band's fourth studio album, Too Weird To Live, Too Rare To Die! (2013). Weekes was also nominated for Best Bassist at the 2015 Alternative Press Music Awards. During the promotion of the band's fifth studio album Death of a Bachelor, it was rumored that Weekes' status has changed to that of a touring member once again. In October 2015, Weekes confirmed his departure from the official line-up of the band via Twitter, stating that he was "not contributing creatively anymore". Dallon announced he was leaving Panic! at the Disco on December 27, 2017. He made this announcement via Instagram.

I Dont Know How But They Found Me (2016–present) 
Initially a solo effort, Weekes had been writing and recording songs while on the road with Panic! at the Disco for several years. Former Brobecks bandmate Ryan Seaman performed drums on the record, which led to Weekes proposing the idea to present it as a duo under the name I Dont Know How But They Found Me.

Weekes and Seaman started playing small shows in late 2016, but kept it secret. They debuted at Emo Nite Los Angeles' 2-year anniversary event on December 6, 2016. After the show, different sources wrote about a "new side project" by Weekes and Seaman, and confirmed the band name. Even when confronted with photos and videos taken at the shows, Weekes and Seaman denied the whole project for months. Weekes later stated that they did not want to exploit both his and Seaman's name recognition and association with the well-known bands they played in. They announced their signing to Fearless Records in August 2018. In November 2018, they released their debut EP, 1981 Extended Play. The band released a Christmas EP, Christmas Drag, on November 15, 2019. The band's debut album, Razzmatazz, was released on October 23, 2020.

Solo musical projects

In September 2010, Weekes posted a free online download of "Skid Row", a song from the film/play Little Shop of Horrors, featuring Brendon Urie of Panic! at the Disco, Matt Glass and Ian Crawford, the touring guitarist of Panic! at the Disco from 2009 to 2012, and former member of such bands as The Cab and Stamps.

In November 2014, Weekes released a Christmas song titled "Sickly Sweet Holidays", featuring former Brobecks and Falling In Reverse drummer Ryan Seaman, and backing vocals performed by Twenty One Pilots vocalist Tyler Joseph. The song initially featured an entire verse by Joseph, but it was excluded due to Joseph's label.

In October 2015, Weekes started a cover series titled "TWOMINCVRS", where he self-releases covers of "lesser-known" songs, with a length of two minutes or less, through his personal YouTube channel. In 2016, Weekes released his second Christmas single titled "Please Don't Jump (It's Christmas)" on November 25, again featuring Seaman performing drums.

Personal life
On March 18, 2006, Weekes married his girlfriend of over a year, Breezy Douglas. They have two children; daughter, Amelie Olivia Weekes, born June 1, 2008 (named after the 2001 French film Amélie); and son, Knox Oliver Weekes, born June 23, 2010 (Named after Knox Overstreet, a character from the 1989 film Dead Poets Society). Weekes is a member of the Church of Jesus Christ of Latter-day Saints. He has ADHD and is neurodivergent.

Discography

The Brobecks 
 The 4th of Julive (2003)
 Understanding the Brobecks (2003)
 A Very Brobecks Christmas EP (2003)
 New Year's Special EP (2003)
 Remixing the Brobecks (2004)
 Happiest Nuclear Winter (2005)
 The Brobecks EP (2005)
 Goodnight, and Have a Pleasant Tomorrow (2006)
 Small Cuts EP (2007)
 I Will, Tonight EP (2008)
 Violent Things (2009)
 Your Mother Should Know EP #1 (2010)
 Quiet Title EP (2012)

Panic! at the Disco 
 Vices & Virtues (2011) (artwork concept)
 iTunes Live (2011)
 Too Weird to Live, Too Rare to Die! (2013)
 Nicotine EP (2014)
 All My Friends We're Glorious: Death of a Bachelor Tour Live (2017)

Solo 
 Xmas Jambz EP (2015)
 TWOMINCVRS EP (2016)

I Dont Know How But They Found Me 
 1981 Extended Play (2018)
 Christmas Drag (2019)
 Razzmatazz (2020)

References

1981 births
Living people
American male singer-songwriters
American indie pop musicians
American pop rock singers
American male guitarists
American rock bass guitarists
American male bass guitarists
American rock songwriters
Panic! at the Disco members
American Latter Day Saints
Singer-songwriters from Missouri
Musicians from Salt Lake City
Guitarists from Utah
Guitarists from Missouri
Fueled by Ramen artists
People from Lawrence County, Missouri
People from Clearfield, Utah
Record producers from Missouri
Record producers from Utah
21st-century American singers
21st-century American bass guitarists
Singer-songwriters from Utah